Masvingo Central is a constituency of the National Assembly of the Parliament of Zimbabwe, located in Masvingo Province. Its current MP since 2018 is Edmond Mhere of ZANU–PF.

Members

References 

Constituencies disestablished in 2013
Constituencies established in 1990
Constituencies established in 2018
Masvingo
Parliamentary constituencies in Zimbabwe